Fuad Hassan (June 26, 1929 – December 7, 2007) was an Indonesian politician.

Biography
Hassan was born in Semarang, Indonesia and was graduated from the University of Indonesia with a PhD in psychology.

He served as the Indonesian Minister of Education under President Suharto from 1985 to 1993. Prior to being Minister of Education, Fuad Hassan also served as an Ambassador of Indonesia to Egypt. 

Since October 2006, Fuad Hassan suffered from complication of diabetic, heart and lung diseases. He was treated at RS Jantung Harapan Kita, National University Hospital (Singapore) and RS Cipto Mangunkusumo. At 3:40 pm on December 7, 2007, he died at the Cipto Mangunkusumo Hospital in Jakarta at the age of 78. He was buried in Kalibata Heroes Cemetery.

Early life and education
Fuad Hassan was born in Semarang, June 26, 1929. His father, Ahmad Hassan, was a businessman and trader of Arabic heritage. In the 1950s, Fuad Hassan moved to the capital city, Jakarta, to study psychology in the University of Indonesia. Graduating in 1958, Fuad continued his educational journey to Canada, studying a post-graduate course in Philosophy and Psychology in the University of Toronto until 1962. In 1967, he obtained a PhD in psychology and in 1990, obtained what is called a Doctor Honoris Causa in Politics from Kyungnam University, Seoul and in Philosophy from Universiti Kebangsaan, Kuala Lumpur.

Political career
Other than his educational career, Fuad Hassan also pursued his opportunity in politics. From 1976 to 1980, Fuad Hassan became Ambassador of Indonesia to Egypt, residing in his residential place in Cairo. His diplomatic task also encompassed surrounding areas such as Sudan, Somalia, and Djibouti. 

After his post as ambassador, Fuad became Head of Research and Development for the Foreign Ministry Department of Indonesia until 1985. While holding this position, he held a chair for the Indonesian People's Consultative Assembly from 1982.
In 1985, Fuad reached the peak of his career, receiving a promotion by the government to become the Minister of Education and Culture. His position ended in 1993, which he replaced by serving for the Supreme Advisory Council until 1998. In addition, he also served as a member of the Asia Europe Foundation representing Indonesia.

Books
"Neurosis sebagai Konflik Existensial", disertasi, Universitas Indonesia, Jakarta, 1967.

"Kita and Kami; The Two Basic Modes of Togetherness",Bhratara,Jakarta,1975 (2nd pr.1989).

"Berkenalan dengan Existensialisme", Pustaka Jaya, Jakarta, 1973, (cet. ke-5 1992).

"Apologia" terjemahan karya Plato disertai pengantar tentang filsafat Yunani, Bulan Bintang,Jakarta,1973 (cet.ke-3,1986).
 
Pengalaman Seorang Haji", Bulan Bintang, Jakarta, 1974,  (cet. ke-3 1986).

"Heteronomia", Pustaka Jaya, Jakarta, 1977 (cet. ke-2 1992).

"Dasacarita dari Hongaria", kumpulan terjemahan 10 cerita pendek dari Hongaria, Grafiti Pers, Jakarta, 1985 (cet. Ke-3 1987) (cet. ke-2 1986).

"Renungan Budaya",kumpulan catatan perihal beberapa masalah  budaya, 
Balai Pustaka, Jakarta, 1988, (cet. ke-5 1993).

"Dimensi Budaya dan Sumberdaya Manusia", Balai Pustaka, Jakarta, 1992.

"Manusia dan Citranya", Aries Lima, Jakarta, 1986, (cet.ke-2 1991).

"Pulang", terjemahan himpunan cerita pendek karya Arpad	Goncz "Homecoming", disertai uraian pengantar, Grafiti Pers, Jakarta, 1994).

"Pentas Kota Raya"; sketsa perikehidupan di kotabesar, Pustaka Jaya, Jakarta, 1995.

"Pengantar Filsafat Barat", Pustaka Jaya, Jakarta, 1996.

References

1929 births
2007 deaths
People from Semarang
Ambassadors of Indonesia to Egypt
Indonesian people of Yemeni descent
Government ministers of Indonesia